The 1985 Pan Arab Games football tournament was the 6th edition of the Pan Arab Games men's football tournament. The football tournament was held in Rabat, Morocco between 4–16 August 1985 as part of the 1985 Pan Arab Games.

Participating teams
Eleven teams took part to the tournament, Algeria participated with the B team and Iraq also with the B team in addition to four players from the A team.
The following countries have participated for the final tournament:

Squads

Group stage
Algeria qualified for semifinals on a draw between second-placed teams.

Group A

Group B

Group C

Knockout stage

Semifinals

Third place match

Final

Final ranking

External links
6th Pan Arab Games, 1985 (Rabat, Morocco) - rsssf.com

1985 Pan Arab Games
1985
Pan
Pan
1985